is a retired Japanese judoka.

Takahashi is from Edogawa, Tokyo and belonged to Asahi Kasei after graduation from Chuo University in 1999.

Takahashi was good at Uchimata and Osotogari.

He won a gold medal at the Asian Championships held in Wenzhou, China and silver medal held in Tashkent, Uzbekistan. He was also participate All-Japan Championships 8 times from 2000 to 2007.

Takahashi retired in 2007. Now, he coaches judo at Kodokan.

Achievements
1995 - All-Japan Junior Championships (+95 kg) 1st
1996 - All-Japan University Championships (+100 kg) 3rd
1997 - All-Japan University Championships (+100 kg) 3rd
1998 - All-Japan University Championships (+100 kg) 1st
1999 - Asian Championships (+100 kg) 1st
2000 - Kodokan Cup (+100 kg) 1st
2001 - East Asian Games (Open) 1st
 - Paris Super World Cup (+100 kg) 3rd
 - Kodokan Cup (+100 kg) 2nd
2002 - Kodokan Cup (+100 kg) 1st
2003 - Jigoro Kano Cup (+100 kg) 2nd
2004 - All-Japan Selected Championships (+100 kg) 3rd
 - Kodokan Cup (+100 kg) 2nd
2005 - Asian Championships (Open) 2nd
 - Jigoro Kano Cup (Openweight only) 3rd
 - All-Japan Selected Championships (+100 kg) 2nd
 - Kodokan Cup (+100 kg) 1st
2006 - Jigoro Kano Cup (+100 kg) 2nd
 - All-Japan Selected Championships (+100 kg) 3rd
 - Kodokan Cup (+100 kg) 3rd

References 

Japanese male judoka
People from Edogawa, Tokyo
1976 births
Living people
20th-century Japanese people
21st-century Japanese people